Li Qi (690–751) was a Chinese poet of the Tang dynasty, with seven of his poems being included in the famous anthology Three Hundred Tang Poems. As translated by Witter Bynner, these are:

 "An Old Air"
 "A Farewell to my Friend Chen Zhangfu"
 "A Lute Song"
 "On Hearing Dong Play the Flageolet a Poem to Palace-attendant Fang"
 "On Hearing an Wanshan Play the Reed-pipe"
 "An Old War-song"
 "A Farewell to Wei Wan"

Biography
Li Qi was born in what is now Zhao County (Zhaoxian), Hebei Province. He later took up residence in what is now Dengfeng, in Henan Province. The Li family of Zhao Commandery (Zhaojun) was of the scholarly (shi) class, one of the so-called "four occupations".

References

External links 

Books of the Quan Tangshi that include collected poems of Li Qi at the Chinese Text Project:
Book 132
Book 133
Book 134

Three Hundred Tang Poems poets
690 births
751 deaths
8th-century Chinese poets